Archeophylla is a genus of liverworts belonging to the family Pseudolepicoleaceae.

The species of this genus are found in New Zealand and Southern America.

Species:

Archeophylla paradoxa 
Archeophylla pungens 
Archeophylla schusteri

References

Jungermanniales
Jungermanniales genera